Qiaodou Village is a village under the administration of Huangshi in Putian's Licheng District on the central coast of Fujian Province, China. It had about 1,000 people during the 2010 census.

Geography
Qiaodou lies on the southern Putian Plain northwest of the Houhai bay or lake.

History
Qiaodou was known as Ninghai during the Song and Ming. It is still home to the ancient stone Ninghai Bridge over a branch of the Mulan.

Religion
Qiaodou is the site of the earliest-attested temple to the Chinese sea goddess Mazu, the deified form of the 10th-century shamaness Lin Moniang. Supposedly, Lin was born on nearby Meizhou Island, usually regarded as the cradle of her cult, but she probably spent her adult life on the mainland. In 1086, she joined the deities venerated at the town's "Holy Mound" (Shengdun) after appearing to the villagers in their dreams following a series of mysterious lights at the mound.

The main temple in the Qiaodou area today is the Jiucha Temple honoring the Great God of Jiucha. Its religious processions occur on the second and third days of the second lunar month.

References

Citations

Bibliography
 .
 .
 .
 . 
 .

Populated places in Fujian
Mazu temples
Villages in China
Putian